This is a list of Monuments of National Importance (ASI) as officially recognized by and available through the website of the Archaeological Survey of India in the Indian state Karnataka (Bengaluru circle).  207 Monuments of National Importance have been recognized by the ASI in Bengaluru circle of Karnataka.

List of monuments 

|}

See also 
 List of Monuments of National Importance in Belgaum district
 List of Monuments of National Importance in Bidar district
 List of Monuments of National Importance in Bijapur district
 List of Monuments of National Importance in Dharwad district
 List of Monuments of National Importance in Gulbarga district
 List of Monuments of National Importance in North Kanara district
 List of Monuments of National Importance in Raichur district
 List of Monuments of National Importance in India for other Monuments of National Importance in India
 List of State Protected Monuments in Karnataka

References

Bangalore